Péter Bíró may refer to:
 Péter Bíró (footballer, born 1985)
 Péter Bíró (footballer, born 1997)